Storosa is a genus of Australian ant spiders first described by Rudy Jocqué in 1991.  it contains only two species. S. obscura is a fast running spider found on the ground between litter.

References

Araneomorphae genera
Spiders of Australia
Zodariidae